Kakinada City Assembly constituency is a constituency in Kakinada district of Andhra Pradesh, representing the state legislative assembly in India. It is one of the seven assembly segments of Kakinada (Lok Sabha constituency), along with Tuni, Prathipadu (SC), Pithapuram, Kakinada Rural and Peddapuram. Dwarampudi Chandrasekhar Reddy is the present MLA of the constituency, who won the 2019 Andhra Pradesh Legislative Assembly election from YSR Congress Party. , there are a total of 255,716 electors in the constituency.

Mandals 

The mandal and wards that form the assembly constituency are:

Members of Legislative Assembly

Election results

Assembly elections 1952

Assembly Elections 2009

Assembly elections 2014

Assembly elections 2019

See also 
 List of constituencies of the Andhra Pradesh Legislative Assembly

References 

Assembly constituencies of Andhra Pradesh